Andreas Meling (22 September 1839 – 8 August 1928) was a Norwegian ship owner and politician.

Biography
He was born in Sole as a son of bailiff Enok Torgersen and Elen Røgh Skavlan. In 1864 he married Lina Monsen, whose brother was a locally known painter and sister married Peter Hærem. Meling was a shipmaster for much of his career, until 1881.

He served as Mayor of Stavanger from 1893. He was elected to the Parliament of Norway in 1894, after having previously served as a deputy representative. He was decorated as a Knight, First Class of the Order of St. Olav in 1896.

References

1839 births
1928 deaths
People from Sola, Norway
Norwegian businesspeople in shipping
Politicians from Stavanger
Mayors of places in Rogaland
Members of the Storting